Peptoniphilus  asaccharolyticus is a species of bacteria belonging to the family Peptoniphilaceae. The cells are small, spherical, and can occur in short chains, in pairs or individually. Peptostreptococcus are slow-growing bacteria sometimes resistant to antimicrobial drugs.

Peptoniphilus  asaccharolyticus is present as part of the microbiota of the lower reproductive tract of women and has been recovered from women with pelvic inflammatory disease.

References

External links 

Pathogenic bacteria
Eubacteriales
Bacterial diseases
Bacteria described in 1912